Responde: Mata ng Mamamayan is a Philippine television public service show broadcast by Net 25. Originally hosted by Onin Miranda and Mavic Trinidad, the program initially titled Responde: Tugon Aksyon Ngayon premiered on November 7, 2011, as part of the network's evening lineup. Nelson Lubao served as the final host of the program's first incarnation before it concluded on July 31, 2019. 

The program returned on November 20, 2021, on the network's Weekends Prime lineup as Responde: Mata ng Mamamayan with Alex Santos currently serving as its program host. 

The program is streaming online on YouTube.

Hosts

 Alex Santos 

Former Hosts

 Onin Miranda 
 Mavic Trinidad 
 Nelson Lubao

See also
List of programs broadcast by Net 25

References

2011 Philippine television series debuts
2019 Philippine television series endings
Filipino-language television shows
Television series revived after cancellation
Net 25 original programming